is a Japanese manga written and illustrated by Akira Sasō. It was adapted into a live action high school coming-of-age comedy drama film titled Ain't No Tomorrows, directed by Yuki Tanada and released on November 22, 2008.

Cast
Tokio Emoto as Mikio
Yuya Endo as Akihiro
Ini Kusano as Anpai
Miwako as Natsuko
Tomorowo Taguchi
Sakura Ando as Chizu
Ayame Misaki as Akie

Reception
On Midnight Eye, Tom Mes said "the overall impression is one of a freshness and vitality so rarely found in youth-oriented drama."

References

External links

Live-action films based on manga
Japanese comedy-drama films
Japanese coming-of-age films
Japanese high school films
Manga adapted into films
Seinen manga
Shogakukan manga
2000s high school films
2008 comedy-drama films
Works by Yuki Tanada
2000s Japanese films